Sidhant Dobal (born 9 October 1993) is an Indian cricketer who plays for Rajasthan. He made his first-class debut on 15 November 2015 in the 2015–16 Ranji Trophy. He made his Twenty20 debut on 9 January 2016 in the 2015–16 Syed Mushtaq Ali Trophy.

References

External links
 

1993 births
Living people
Indian cricketers
Rajasthan cricketers
Cricketers from Delhi